Ochs Glacier is a glacier flowing to the head of Block Bay between Mount Iphigene and Mount Avers, in the Ford Ranges of Marie Byrd Land.

It was discovered by the Byrd Antarctic Expedition in 1929, and named for Adolph S. Ochs, publisher of the New York Times, a patron of the expedition.

References

Glaciers of Marie Byrd Land
Ford Ranges